The 37th Fajr Film Festival was held from 1 to 11 February 2019 in Tehran, Iran. The nominees for the 37th Fajr Film Festival were announced on February 10, 2019, at a press conference.

Jury

Main Competition 
 Mohammad Ehsani
 Mohammad Ali Bashe Ahangar
 Mohammad Bozorgnia
 Mehrzad Danesh
 Pouran Derakhshandeh
 Rima Raminfar
 Mahmoud Kalari

First Look, Short Film, Documentary 
 Mohammad Afarideh
 Habib Ahmadzadeh
 Aida Panahandeh
 Saeed Soheili
 Maziar Miri

Winners and nominees

Main Competition

First Look

Advertising Competition

Films with multiple wins

Films with multiple nominations

Films

Main Competition

First Look

Animation

Documentary

Short Film

References

External links 
 37th Fajr Film Festival at IMDb

Fajr International Film Festival ceremonies
Film festivals in Tehran
2019 in Iran
2019 film festivals